Acton Town is a London Underground station in the south-west corner of Acton, West London, in the London Borough of Ealing, close to the border with the London Borough of Hounslow. The station is served by the District and Piccadilly lines and is in Travelcard Zone 3. On the District line, it is between Chiswick Park and Ealing Common stations, and on the Piccadilly line it is between Hammersmith (Turnham Green in the early mornings and late evenings) and Ealing Common on the Uxbridge branch & South Ealing on the Heathrow branch.
Acton Town station was opened as Mill Hill Park on 1 July 1879 by the District Railway (DR, now the District line). It remained as a terminus until on 1 May 1883 and 23 June 1903 the DR opened two branches from Acton Town to Hounslow Town and Park Royal & Twyford Abbey respectively. On 4 July 1932 the Piccadilly line was extended to Acton Town. District line services to both the Hounslow and Uxbridge branches were withdrawn completely on 9 and 10 October 1964 after which operations were provided by the Piccadilly line alone.

The original brick-built station was built in 1879 and in February 1910 the station building was reconstructed. On 1 March 1910 the station was given its present name. In 1931 and 1932 the station was rebuilt again in preparation for transferring the Uxbridge branch service from the District line to the Piccadilly line. The new station was designed by Charles Holden in a modern European geometric style using brick, reinforced concrete and glass.

Location

The station is at the junction of Gunnersbury Lane (A4000) and Bollo Lane. To the south-west of the station is the former Acton Works, central overhaul and engineering works for the London Underground. It is now home to the London Transport Museum's reserve collection of rail and road vehicles (as known as London Transport Museum Depot or Museum Depot). The museum depot is opened to the public on a number of weekends throughout the year. To the north of the station is the District line's Ealing Common Depot.

Frank Pick House is near the station, on Gunnersbury Lane. It is named after Frank Pick, the London Passenger Transport Board's chief executive. It is home to one of the engineering departments of the London Underground.

History

District line

Hounslow and Uxbridge branches
Acton Town station was opened as Mill Hill Park on 1 July 1879 by the District Railway (DR, now the District line) on its extension from Turnham Green to Ealing Broadway. On 1 May 1883 the DR opened a branch from Acton Town to the now defunct Hounslow Town station, which developed into the Heathrow branch. On 23 June 1903 the DR tracks extended north of Acton Town to a new station at Park Royal & Twyford Abbey which became the first of the Underground's surface lines to use electric traction instead of steam with the Acton Town – Ealing Common section also electrified. The existing deep tube lines, (City and South London Railway, Waterloo & City Railway (now Waterloo & City line) and Central London Railway) had always been electrically powered. Services on the Hounslow branch (now the Heathrow branch) and to Central London were electrified on 13 June 1905 and 1 July 1905 respectively.

South Acton branch

On 13 June 1905, a passenger service began on the short branch to South Acton. A short fifth platform for the single car train of the South Acton branch was provided to the north of the eastbound island platform. At first the service ran to Hounslow West and to Uxbridge but it was later reduced to a shuttle between Acton Town and South Acton on 15 February 1932. The South Acton branch was closed on 28 February 1959 due to low usage; its platform at Acton Town has not been removed and is still visible. Much of the branch remains including a bridge support on the south side of Bollo Lane. In the picture, the area behind the hoarding in the background is the location of the former branch platform (Platform 5) which was only ever very short, two carriages at most. Part of a dismantled bridge where the shuttle crossed Bollo Lane remains near the entrance to Acton Works

Piccadilly line
On 4 July 1932, the Piccadilly line was extended west from its original terminus at Hammersmith and shared the route with the District line to Ealing Common. From Ealing Common to South Harrow, the District line was replaced by the Piccadilly line, and from that date, District line trains from Acton Town ran only either to Hounslow West or to Ealing Broadway. On 9 January 1933 Piccadilly line trains, sharing with the District line, began serving Northfields on the Hounslow branch, and their service was extended to Hounslow West on 13 March 1933 but Piccadilly line trains did not call at South Ealing until 1935. District line services on the Hounslow branch were withdrawn on 9 and 10 October 1964 after which operations were provided by the Piccadilly line alone.

Station building

The original brick-built station was built in 1879. In February 1910 the station building was reconstructed and on 1 March 1910 the station was given its present name. In 1931 and 1932 the station was rebuilt again in preparation for transferring the Uxbridge branch service from the District line to the Piccadilly line. The new station was designed by Charles Holden in a modern European geometric style using brick, reinforced concrete and glass.

As other stations Holden designed, Acton Town station features a tall block-like ticket hall rising above a low horizontal structure housing the station offices and shops. The ticket hall has a projecting London Underground roundel sign over a canopy, the brick walls of the ticket hall are punctuated with panels of clerestory windows and the structure is capped with a flat concrete slab roof. From the ticket hall enclosed stairs descend to the platforms under integral concrete canopies on paired piers in alternating broad and narrow bay formation. A part of the narrow bays is infilled by kiosks, integral poster boards, roundel signs and fixed seating. The platforms are linked by a secondary bridge at the southern end. Reinforced concrete platform canopies replaced the original timber canopies. Since 17 May 1994, the station has been a Grade II Listed building.

The stated reason for why it should be listed was:

"Reinforced concrete post and lintel construction with red brick infill, some load-bearing. Symmetrical almost square and double-height ticket hall flanked by kiosks on bridge, from which parade of shops descends to Bollo Lane with secondary entrance under stepped boxed lighting to the rear. Ticket hall gives on to complex access area with open frame construction, whence enclosed stairs descend to platforms under integral concrete. canopies - incorporating clerestory - on paired piers in alternating broad and narrow bay formation. The narrow bays part infilled by kiosks, integral poster boards, roundel signs and fixed seating. The platforms are linked by a secondary bridge at the southern end. All the frontage shops have their original bronzed glazing, particularly elaborate in the taller frontages to Bollo Lane and in the side passage. All shopdoors original save that to single shop east of station. The station windows metal with strong horizontal emphasis in their glazing bars. Ticket hall has projecting roundel sign over canopy, and three double-height paired windows to street frontage with similar windows at upper level to rear. Exposed concrete frame to ceiling, rendered upper walls with brown tiling below. Original tiled floors. Included as an important example of Holden's mature work for an interchange station."

Services and connections

Services

Between Acton Town and Hammersmith, District line trains serve all stations, but Piccadilly line trains run non-stop to Hammersmith except for calling at Turnham Green at the start and end of the day. The run between Acton Town and Hammersmith spans nearly three miles – the longest distance between stops on the Piccadilly line. West of Acton Town, District line trains go via Ealing Common to Ealing Broadway and Piccadilly line trains run either via South Ealing to Heathrow, or via Ealing Common to Uxbridge.

District line
The typical off-peak service in trains per hour (tph) is:
6tph eastbound to Upminster (Barking on Sundays)
6tph westbound to Ealing Broadway

There is also a morning service every day from Acton Town (Ealing Broadway on Saturdays) to Edgware Road and a late evening service from Edgware Road to Ealing Broadway on Sundays only.

Piccadilly line
Train frequencies vary throughout the day, but generally operate every 2–5 minutes eastbound, Off-Peak = 3 tph to Uxbridge and 3 tph to Rayners Lane, Peak = 6 tph to Uxbridge and 6 tph to Rayners Lane, and every 2–7 minutes westbound to Heathrow Terminal 2 & 3 and Terminal 5 or via the Heathrow Terminal 4 loop. Since 16 December 2016, Acton Town is also served by Night Tube trains between Cockfosters and Heathrow Terminal 5.

During occasional closures on the District line, the Piccadilly line provides additional services to serve destinations on the District line such as Ealing Broadway. This is done either by diverting some trains bound for Rayners Lane and Uxbridge, or as a shuttle from Acton Town. Also, Piccadilly line trains may also run on the District line tracks between Hammersmith and Acton Town to serve the District line stations with no platforms on the Piccadilly line, namely Ravenscourt Park, Stamford Brook, Turnham Green and Chiswick Park.

Connections
London Buses routes 70, E3 and night route N11 serve the station.

Incidents 
On 25 March 1993, a woman named Jean Bradley was stabbed to death by a man after leaving Acton Town tube station. The notorious murder still remains unsolved.

On Tuesday, February 1, 2022, there was a large fire at the Autocar Centre, a garage where the now-abandoned Platform 5 is, which subsequently caused the evacuation of the station and "severe delays" to the District Line and Piccadilly Line. 10 fire engines and 70 firefighters  were sent to the scene after being called at 5:10 PM and stayed there until late at night, bringing the fire under control. The cause of the fire is not yet known, but will be investigated by the LFB. Since the fire, witnesses in the area have described the roof as burned and partially caved in, though the damage to the abandoned Platform 5 itself is unknown.

Gallery

Notes and references

Notes

References

Further reading

External links
 
 
 
 
 
 
 

District line stations
Piccadilly line stations
London Underground Night Tube stations
Tube stations in the London Borough of Ealing
Former Metropolitan District Railway stations
Railway stations in Great Britain opened in 1879
Charles Holden railway stations
Art Deco architecture in London
Grade II listed buildings in the London Borough of Ealing
Grade II listed railway stations
Acton, London